Dafen station is a station on Line 3 of the Shenzhen Metro. It opened on 28 December 2010. It is located on Shenhui Road near Kangda'er Garden and Dafen Oil Painting Village.

Station layout

Exits

See also 
 Dafen Village

References

External links 
 Shenzhen Metro Dafen Station (Chinese)
 Shenzhen Metro Dafen Station (English)

Shenzhen Metro stations
Railway stations in Guangdong
Longgang District, Shenzhen
Railway stations in China opened in 2010